Larry Bowie may refer to:

Larry Bowie (guard) (1939–2012), American football guard
Larry Bowie (running back) (born 1973), American football running back